The Sécure River is a river of Bolivia.

See also
List of rivers of Bolivia
Isiboro Sécure National Park and Indigenous Territory

References
Rand McNally, The New International Atlas, 1993.

Rivers of Beni Department